Bowen's Landing, California was a lumber port / "doghole port" about  north of San Francisco.

It seems to be the same place as Bourn's Landing, or Bourne's Landing.

References

Populated places in California